Diamondhead is a city in southeastern Hancock County, Mississippi, United States. It is part of the Gulfport−Biloxi Metropolitan Statistical Area. In February 2012, Diamondhead was officially incorporated as a city. In the 2020 USA decennial census, the city population was 9,529.

History

Resort community
On October 25, 1961, NASA announced the formation of the Mississippi Test Facility, now the John C. Stennis Space Center. The center would be located in an area bordering the Pearl River in Hancock County. During and following the construction of the facility, an influx of government workers, contractors, and their families moved into the area.

Much of the land that became Diamondhead had been purchased by Walter Gex Sr., in 1937 from the Gulf State Paper Company and the Easy Opener Bag Company. In the late 1960s, D.E.A.R., Inc., later known as the Diamondhead Corporation, a large corporation interested in resort developments, began operations on the Mississippi Coast, with Diamondhead as its first project. Coastal Mississippi had been a popular vacation destination for years, particularly with Midwesterners. Its location was ideal as a second home development given the convenient access via Interstate 55. The land on which Diamondhead is located is the highest point of elevation ( above sea level) on the Gulf Coast in Mississippi. Therefore, the project was named "Diamondhead" after Diamond Head, an iconic volcanic cone on the Hawaiian island of Oahu.

Plans for the largest resort-type community in the southern United States were unveiled at a press conference in 1969. Hawaiian-style architecture, landscape, and road names were featured in the development. The company became interested in purchasing  of property adjacent to Interstate 10, which was still under construction in the Mississippi Coast area in the 1960s. An interchange on I-10 would be located near the center of the development. When completed, Diamondhead was expected to represent a total investment cost of $10 million.

The corporation was scheduled to close on the purchase on August 18, 1969, one day after Hurricane Camille made landfall in Hancock County. Shortly after the storm left the area, the investment team was able to survey the damage and found that the area around current-day Diamondhead received far less damage than other coastal areas. Seeing such little damage from Camille, the investment team decided to go ahead with the project. Soon after, Diamondhead had streets, lots, infrastructure, model homes, a country club, an airport, a driving range, and a pavilion that would become the community center. Construction of I-10 to the exit at Diamondhead was completed in October 1970, allowing greater traffic access to Diamondhead. By June 1973, 3,700 lots had been sold and 31 homes had been constructed, with another 29 under construction. Diamondhead was responsible for much economic growth by creating opportunities for builders, tradesmen, and service industries related to the construction industry. The community also benefitted from other growth along the coast as employees from the Naval Oceanographic Office at Stennis Space Center, the Michoud Assembly Facility in New Orleans East, and other developments around the area chose to live in Diamondhead. By the end of the 1970s, 6,500 of the 10,000 lots offered at Diamondhead had been sold. Most of the early residents came from New Orleans, but later residents came from all over the United States. A survey taken in the late 1970s revealed that a large percentage of property owners came from New Orleans to escape overcrowding conditions.

Diamondhead was organized as a property owners association (POA). On January 1, 1985, the Purcell Company (formerly the Diamondhead Corporation) turned over the POA to a homeowner-elected board of directors. Diamondhead continued to grow after the turnover. As more people and families moved into the community, the demographics became more diverse and less of a second home for retirees. The demographic makeup of Diamondhead changed from that of a retirement community to that of any small suburban-type area. The population of the community became younger, with 54.6% of the population over age 45 in 2000, down from 61.1% in 1990. Tensions began to develop among different groups. Many began to question the POA's decisions, especially over increasing monthly dues and spending large amounts of money on golf course maintenance. In 1994, those who did not want the POA to lead the community began to advocate incorporation and conducted a petition drive for Diamondhead to become a city. This initial attempt at incorporation ultimately stalled but did not ease tensions between advocates and opponents.

Hurricane Katrina

On August 29, 2005, Hurricane Katrina made its third landfall on the Mississippi Coast. Before and during landfall, water poured into the Bay of St. Louis, and the initial flooding occurred in low-lying areas along the Jourdan River and its tributary bayous. Therefore, Diamondhead and Kiln began to flood before the bulk of the surge came. A record storm surge of nearly  caused extensive damage. Many homes were badly damaged or completely destroyed, especially those homes on the south side of Diamondhead, facing the Bay of Saint Louis. The commercial center, including stores and restaurants, was mostly destroyed. A 1,000-gallon aviation fuel tank from the airport in Diamondhead floated onto I-10. The north side fared better, and many of the people whose homes had been destroyed in neighboring cities, as well as in Diamondhead, moved into the houses which remained on the north side. Overnight, the population swelled from 6,500 to 9,000.

Incorporation
Following Hurricane Katrina, the POA found itself facing issues that it had not anticipated that brought back the issue regarding incorporation. A city would be eligible for federal or state financial resources that the POA would not have access to as a private entity. Concerns about the expiration of the various covenants that governed different areas within the POA also created anxiety among homeowners. In July 2006, the POA commissioned a study to determine how to best protect its assets. The study ultimately determined that incorporation would be the best route.

In 2009, a petition supported by the Property Owners Association (POA) to hold an incorporation election was filed with the Hancock Chancery Court, and an election approved the incorporation. Opponents contended that the petition lacked a sufficient number of signatures and that incorporation requirements were not complied with. In 2010, the Hancock Chancery Court ruled against the opponents, who then appealed to the Supreme Court of Mississippi. The appeal further claimed irregularities during the hearing on the original objection. On October 29, 2011, the Supreme Court of Mississippi upheld the Hancock Chancery Court and ruled against the irregularity claims. In January 2012, a motion for extension to appeal the decision was denied by the Supreme Court, and a final edict mandating the incorporation was issued. The City of Diamondhead was presented its charter as the 111th city in Mississippi by Secretary of State Delbert Hosemann on February 6, 2012.

Geography
The city is bordered to the south by the Bay of Saint Louis. Rotten Bayou runs west and northwest of the city. Harrison County borders Diamondhead to the east.

Major highways
  Interstate 10 runs through the southern part of the city, with access from Exit 16. I-10 leads east  to Biloxi and southwest  to New Orleans.

Nearby cities and towns
Bay St. Louis ( south by road)
DeLisle ( east)
Kiln (7 miles northwest)
Shoreline Park ( south)
Waveland ( south)

Climate
The average temperature of Diamondhead is 67 °F, which is higher than the Mississippi average temperature of 64 °F and is much higher than the national average temperature of 54 °F.

Demographics

2020 census

As of the 2020 United States census, there were 9,529 people, 3,767 households, and 2,630 families residing in the city.

2010 census
As of the 2010 census, there were 8,425 people, 3,586 households, and 2,507 families residing in the CDP. The population density was 745.6 people per square mile (286.6/km2). There were 4,308 housing units at an average density of 381.2/sq mi (146.5/km2). The racial makeup of the CDP was 93.9% White, 2.9% African American, 0.4% Native American, 1.1% Asian, 0.1% Pacific Islander, 0.3% from other races, and 1.2% from two or more races. Hispanic or Latino of any race were 3.3% of the population.

There were 3,586 households, out of which 23.8% had children under the age of 18 living with them, 59.3% were married couples living together, 7.4% had a female householder with no husband present, and 30.1% were non-families. 25.9% of all households were made up of individuals, and 12.2% had someone living alone who was 65 years of age or older. The average household size was 2.31 and the average family size was 2.77.

In the CDP the population was spread out, with 21.1% under the age of 18, 3.6% from 18 to 24, 20.7% from 25 to 44, 28.9% from 45 to 64, and 25.7% who were 65 years of age or older. The median age was 48 years. For every 100 females, there were 93.9 males. Females made up 52% of the population.

The median income for a household in the CDP was $51,361, and the median income for a family was $58,533. Males had a median income of $41,725 versus $29,595 for females. The per capita income for the CDP was $26,631. About 4.3% of families and 7.2% of the population were below the poverty line, including 10.7% of those under age 18 and 2.7% of those age 65 or over.

Economy

Casinos

A casino deal between Donald Trump and Diamondhead Casino Corporation fell through around March 1, 2007. DHCC still wishes to proceed and establish a casino. The Isle of Capri construction plans at the Kiln-DeLisle exit of Interstate 10 had been canceled as of November 8, 2007.

As of late 2008, casinos had applied for zoning in the south side of Diamondhead that was obliterated by Hurricane Katrina. The Silver Slipper Casino from nearby Lakeshore built a seafood restaurant, the Pier House now named Hula Club, at the former site of the yacht club over the water. The eighty-eight acres north of there is also planned to be a major resort casino. It would be the only casino in Mississippi with virtually direct interstate access (I-10).

As of June 27, 2014, the Mississippi Gaming Commission denied the site application as not being on the Bay of Saint Louis.

Parks and recreation

Since most of Diamondhead was a planned community it has many facilities designed to attract home buyers. Some of these facilities include:
 Marina, Yacht Club, Tennis World, and Country Club with multiple dining facilities
 The Pines and Cardinal 18-Hole professional golf courses (36 holes)
 community pools throughout the area
 community center and separate adult learning center
 community grocery and hardware stores
 multiple ponds and lakes
 several homes have direct access to the Gulf of Mexico, as well as the marina and yacht club
 several restaurants, bowling, hotels, automotive stations
 Private airstrip including direct access between the airstrip and private homes allowing planes to be housed at a home owners house.
 Military Order of the Purple Heart, Chapter 771

Education
Diamondhead is served by the Hancock County School District.

All of Hancock County is in the service area of Pearl River Community College.

Local schools of note
Hancock High School
Our Lady Academy
Saint Stanislaus College

References

External links
City of Diamondhead official website

Cities in Mississippi
Cities in Hancock County, Mississippi
Gulfport–Biloxi metropolitan area
Populated places established in 2012